Sisters Island is an island in River Raisin. It is in Monroe County, Michigan.

See also
Sterling Island
Strong Island (Michigan)

References

Islands of Monroe County, Michigan